The Nomenclature of Territorial Units for Statistics (NUTS) is a geocode standard for referencing the subdivisions of Austria for statistical purposes. The standard is developed and regulated by the European Union. The NUTS standard is instrumental in delivering the European Union's Structural Funds. The NUTS code for Austria is AT and a hierarchy of three levels is established by Eurostat. Below these is a further levels of geographic organisation - the local administrative unit (LAU). In Austria, the LAU 2 is municipalities.

Overall

NUTS Levels

Local administrative units 

Below the NUTS levels, the two LAU (Local Administrative Units) levels are:

The LAU codes of Austria can be downloaded here: NUTS codes

 NUTS 3 definitions 
 AT1 Eastern Austria (Ostösterreich)
 AT11 Burgenland
 AT111 Mittelburgenland (Bezirk Oberpullendorf)
 AT112 Nordburgenland (Eisenstadt, Rust, Bezirk Eisenstadt-Umgebung, Bezirk Mattersburg, Bezirk Neusiedl am See)
 AT113 Südburgenland (Bezirk Güssing, Bezirk Jennersdorf, Bezirk Oberwart)
 AT12 Lower Austria (Niederösterreich)
 AT121 Mostviertel-Eisenwurzen (Waidhofen an der Ybbs, Bezirk Amstetten, Bezirk Melk, Bezirk Scheibbs)
 AT122 Niederösterreich-Süd (Wiener Neustadt, Bezirk Lilienfeld, Bezirk Neunkirchen, Bezirk Wiener Neustadt-Land)
 AT123 Sankt Pölten (Sankt Pölten, Bezirk Sankt Pölten-Land)
 AT124 Waldviertel (Krems, Bezirk Gmünd, Bezirk Horn, Bezirk Krems-Land, Bezirk Waidhofen an der Thaya, Bezirk Zwettl)
 AT125 Weinviertel (Bezirk Hollabrunn, part of Bezirk Mistelbach, part of Bezirk Gänserndorf)
 AT126 Wiener Umland/Nordteil (Bezirk Korneuburg, Bezirk Tulln, part of Bezirken Gänserndorf, part of Bezirk Mistelbach, part of Bezirken Wien-Umgebung)
 AT127 Wiener Umland/Südteil (Bezirk Bruck an der Leitha, Bezirk Baden, Bezirk Mödling, part of Bezirk Wien-Umgebung)
 AT13 Vienna (Wien)
 AT130 Wien
 AT2 Southern Austria (Südösterreich)
 AT21 Carinthia (Kärnten)
 AT211 Klagenfurt-Villach (Klagenfurt, Villach, Bezirk Klagenfurt-Land, Bezirk Villach-Land)
 AT212 Oberkärnten (Bezirk Feldkirchen, Bezirk Hermagor, Bezirk Spittal an der Drau)
 AT213 Unterkärnten (Bezirk Sankt Veit an der Glan, Bezirk Völkermarkt, Bezirk Wolfsberg)
 AT22 Styria (Steiermark)
 AT221 Graz (Graz, Bezirk Graz-Umgebung)
 AT222 Liezen (Bezirk Liezen)
 AT223 Östliche Obersteiermark (Bezirk Bruck an der Mur, Bezirk Leoben, Bezirk Mürzzuschlag)
 AT224 Oststeiermark (Bezirk Feldbach, Bezirk Fürstenfeld, Bezirk Hartberg, Bezirk Radkersburg, Bezirk Weiz)
 AT225 West- und Südsteiermark (Bezirk Deutschlandsberg, Bezirk Leibnitz, Bezirk Voitsberg)
 AT226 Westliche Obersteiermark (Bezirk Judenburg, Bezirk Knittelfeld, Bezirk Murau)
 AT3 Western Austria (Westösterreich)
 AT31 Upper Austria (Oberösterreich)  
 AT311 Innviertel (Bezirk Braunau am Inn, Bezirk Grieskirchen, Bezirk Ried im Innkreis, Bezirk Schärding)
 AT312 Linz-Wels (Linz, Wels, Bezirk Linz-Land, Bezirk Wels-Land, Bezirk Eferding, part of Bezirk Urfahr-Umgebung)
 AT313 Mühlviertel (Bezirk Freistadt, Bezirk Perg, Bezirk Rohrbach, part of Bezirk Urfahr-Umgebung)
 AT314 Steyr-Kirchdorf (Steyr, Bezirk Kirchdorf an der Krems, Bezirk Steyr-Land)
 AT315 Traunviertel (Bezirk Gmunden, Bezirk Vöcklabruck)
 AT32 Salzburg
 AT321 Lungau (Bezirk Tamsweg)
 AT322 Pinzgau-Pongau (Bezirk Sankt Johann im Pongau, Bezirk Zell am See)
 AT323 Salzburg und Umgebung (Salzburg, Bezirk Salzburg-Umgebung, Bezirk Hallein)
 AT33 Tyrol (Tirol)
 AT331 Außerfern (Bezirk Reutte)
 AT332 Innsbruck (Innsbruck, Bezirk Innsbruck Land)
 AT333 Osttirol (Bezirk Lienz)
 AT334 Tyrolean Oberland (Tiroler Oberland) (Bezirk Imst, Bezirk Landeck)
 AT335 Tyrolean Unterland (Tiroler Unterland'') (Bezirk Kitzbühel, Bezirk Kufstein, Bezirk Schwaz)
 AT34 Vorarlberg
 AT341 Bludenz-Bregenzer Wald (Bezirk Bludenz, part of Bezirk Bregenz)
 AT342 Rheintal-Bodenseegebiet (Bezirk Dornbirn, Bezirk Feldkirch, part of Bezirk Bregenz)

See also
 Subdivisions of Austria
 ISO 3166-2 codes of Austria
 FIPS region codes of Austria

References

Sources
 Hierarchical list of the Nomenclature of territorial units for statistics - NUTS and the Statistical regions of Europe
 Overview map of EU Countries - NUTS level 1
 ÖSTERREICH - NUTS levels 
 Correspondence between the NUTS levels and the national administrative units
 List of current NUTS codes
 Download current NUTS codes (ODS format)
 States of Austria, Statoids.com
 Districts of Austria, Statoids.com

Austria
Nuts